Gambini is an Italian surname. Notable people with the surname include:

Pierre Gambini, French songwriter and composer
Rodolfo Gambini (born 1946), Uruguayan physicist
Rodolfo Gambini (painter) (1855–1928), Italian painter

See also
Pier Antonio Quarantotti Gambini (1910–1965), Italian writer and journalist
The Great Gambini, a 1937 American film

Italian-language surnames